The Air Force checkerboard is a national marking for the aircraft of the Polish Air Force, equivalent to roundels used in other nations' air forces. It consists of four equal squares, of which the upper left and lower right are white, and the other two – red. These are surrounded by a border of inverted (counterchanged) colors 1/5 the thickness of a single square. In 1993 the colors were reversed (i.e. white in the upper left).

Initially, Polish military aircraft used various signs in national colors (red and white), most frequently shields party per bend, pale, or red letter "Z" in a white square. The four-field, red-white checkerboard, was first used as a personal insignia of the Polish fighter pilot Stefan Stec. It was adopted as the Polish national roundel on 1 December 1918.

In 1921 a contrasting red and white border was added, but without specified dimensions. In 1930 the ratio of border to fields was fixed at 1:5. According to current regulations, an additional gray border can be added, 1:6 the size of the field, if the insignia is displayed on a white or red background.

Between the 1960s and 1980s the checkerboard (usually rotated 45 degrees) was also painted on turrets and hulls of Polish Army tanks and APCs. This tradition has since been discontinued.

In 1993 the color order was changed from red-dominant (red in the upper left) to white-dominant, to conform to heraldic rules, though ignoring the 70-year-old tradition. The first white-dominant checkerboard was used in 1940 in France.

Heraldic rules
In heraldry, the color of the charge (in this case the white of the Polish eagle) takes precedence over the shield (red in the case of the Polish coat of arms). Because of this, white should be given the most "dominant" or dignified position in a heraldic design representing Poland. In the case of a checkerboard, this would be the upper left corner. (When hung vertically the Polish flag should have white on the left for exactly the same reason). Note that this rule applies to the main color squares, not to the thin border, which is considered decoration.

Versions

Military symbols
National symbols of Poland
Aircraft markings